The Sky Spear (天戟 Tien Chi) is a Taiwanese short-range ballistic missile (SRBM) capable of striking targets on mainland China. Derived from the Sky Bow II (Tien Kung-2) surface-to-air missile, the Tien Chi has a two-stage booster that extends over the single-stage Tien Kung-2. The Sky Spear was developed by the Chungshan Institute of Science and Technology (CSIST) in Taiwan. As of early 2001, up to 50 Tien Chi missiles were deployed at two sites: Tungyin Island, and an unidentified second location. The Tungyin Island missiles are said to be housed in silos and protected by batteries of Tien Kung-2 SAMs.

Information provided by CSIST to Jane's Missiles and Rockets, revealed that Tien Chi uses a submunition warhead and there is no unitary warhead for this missile. According to this report, Tien Chi was developed by CSIST following test firings of a Tien Kung 2 variant with a 120 km range and a 90 kg HE warhead. The report also credited Tien Chi missile with a range of 300 km and a 500 kg payload. This range is well beyond the reported 200 km maximum range of the Tien Kung II SAM system, but since Tien Chi is used in a tactical surface-to-surface missile role, it would fly a more efficient trajectory with no need for energy-consuming manoeuvres. Guidance is believed to be an integrated INS/GPS system.

It has been reported that Taiwan has deployed 15-50 missiles on Tungyin and Penghu.

General characteristics
 Primary Function: Surface-to-surface missile
 Warhead Weight 100 kg

See also 
 Hrim-2 (missile system)
 9K720 Iskander
 DF-11
 Khalij Fars
 Ghaznavi
 Abdali-I
 Shaheen-I
 J-600T Yıldırım
 Fateh-313
 Qiam 1
 B-611
 Al Hussein (missile)
 Burkan-1

References

Short-range ballistic missiles
Ballistic missiles of Taiwan
Weapons and ammunition introduced in 2001